Mie Leth Jans (born 6 February 1994) is a Danish football player who plays as defender for HB Køge and the Danish national team for which she debuted in 2013.

Club career
Leth Jans started her football career in Dragør Boldklub. She moved to Ballerup-Skovlunde Fodbold (BSF) in 2012. After two seasons playing in BSF's first team, she went back to her youth club Brøndby IF in June 2014. In June 2017, she signed a two-year contract with defending English champions Manchester City.

In January 2019 she moved to Swedish club FC Rosengård.

In September 2021, Leth Jans joined Australian W-League club Perth Glory.

International career
Leth Jans made her debut for the Danish national team in November 2013. She came on as a substitute for future Brøndby IF teammate Nanna Christiansen in the 79th minute during a 2015 FIFA Women's World Cup qualifying game against Malta in Valletta. She was part of the Danish roster at the 2016 Algarve Cup and the UEFA Women's Euro 2017.

References

External links
 
 Manchester City profile
 
 Profile at Danish Football Association 
 Mie Leth Jans at Instagram 
 Mie Leth Jans at Facebook

1994 births
Living people
Danish women's footballers
Place of birth missing (living people)
Denmark women's international footballers
Danish expatriate women's footballers
Danish expatriate sportspeople in England
Expatriate women's footballers in England
Brøndby IF (women) players
Women's association football defenders
Manchester City W.F.C. players
FC Rosengård players
Vittsjö GIK players
Perth Glory FC (A-League Women) players
Women's Super League players
Expatriate women's footballers in Sweden
Danish expatriate sportspeople in Sweden
Damallsvenskan players
Ballerup-Skovlunde Fodbold (women) players
UEFA Women's Euro 2017 players